Eroia Barone-Nugent is an Australian science educator.  Barone-Nugent is experienced with secondary science teaching, science and education research and she is an education program leader and innovator. She leads the Growing Tall Poppies Science Partnership Program. She is funded by the Australian Government's 'Australian Mathematics and Science Partnership Program' (AMSPP). The goal of her program is to increase the number students, especially girls, studying science and particularly physics to year 12.

Career
Barone-Nugent is an Honorary Senior Fellow in the School of Physics at the University of Melbourne and an Adjunct Assoc Prof in the College of Science Health & Engineering at La Trobe University. She has been the NAB Schools First State Winner 2009; BHP Billiton Science Teacher Victoria 2010; Prime Minister’s Highly Commended Science Teacher 2011 & 2012 & Eureka Prize for Science Teaching Finalist 2012. The Growing Tall Poppies Science Partnership Program is active in Victoria and expanding to NSW and Queensland.

In 2009 Barone-Nugent was named as 'A Victorian Who Inspired Us' for her contribution to science education.
In 2010 and 2011 Barone-Nugent was a Highly Commended Teacher in the Prime Ministers Australian Science Teacher Prizes.

Eureka Prize finalist
Barone-Nugent, a secondary science teacher, was one of three finalists for the 2012 Eureka Prize for Science or Mathematics Teaching. The nomination was in recognition of her work with the Growing Tall Poppies Program (GTP) in schools. The program is a collaboration between schools, systems, and universities to raise the profile and quality of teaching of physical sciences for girls.

Growing Tall Poppies Program
The Growing Tall Poppies Program (GTP) was founded through a common interest between Barone-Nugent and Keith Nugent. The aim was to engage students with physics before they made their subject choices for their final years of high school. Over the last few years the number of students in these physical sciences have decreased, especially with women. GTP wants to create an awareness of the opportunities that can arise from physics and how it can help people, by creating scientifically aware students.

GTP science partnership program is a partnership between the University of Melbourne, La Trobe University, Griffith University, University of New South Wales, Deakin University, The Australian Synchrotron, ANSTO, Catholic Education Office Melbourne, ARC Centre of Excellence in Advanced Molecular Imaging, ARC Centre of Excellence for Mathematical and Statistical Frontiers, Santa Maria College (Northcote), and Charles La Trobe Secondary College.

References

External links
Official website

Australian schoolteachers
Living people
1959 births